The A643 is a main road between Leeds and Huddersfield in West Yorkshire, England. 

Its eastern end is at the Armley Gyratory roundabout on the western edge of Leeds City Centre. The road then goes through:

 Beeston
 Churwell
 Morley
 Bruntcliffe
 Howden Clough
 Birstall
 Gomersal
 Cleckheaton
 Hartshead Moor Top
 Clifton
 Brighouse
 Rastrick
 Ainley Top

Road features

In Leeds, the road is a dual carriageway that links the Armley Gyratory roundabout with the M621 motorway at junction 2. This part of the A643 is known as the Ingram Distributor. It is a vital road artery to the city as it links the city centre with the Motorway. If accidents happen there, then this could cause traffic congestion around the city.

The Leeds United AFC football stadium in Beeston is named after the road part of the A643 that passes it, Elland Road. This road is so called because the A643 originally ended in town of Elland near Halifax. 

The A643 road goes over the River Calder in Brighouse as Rastrick Bridge.

References

External links

 A643 Outlane to Leeds SABRE - road description

 

Roads in Yorkshire
Transport in West Yorkshire